Vanvitelli is an underground metro station that serves Line 1 on the Naples Metro. It was opened on 28 May 1993 as the southern terminus of the inaugural section of Naples Metro, between Vanvitelli and Colli Aminei. On 5 April 2001, the line was extended to Museo, and Vanvitelli ceased to be the terminus.

The station was built according to the plans of Michele Capobianco and has undergone a radical restoration (thanks to which the station is part of the circuit of art stations) directed by Michele Capobianco and his son Lorenzo Capobianco with artistic consulting by Achille Bonito Oliva.

The entrances are placed in the four corners of Piazza Vanvitelli, as well as an underground corridor that leads from the station directly to the two funiculars namely that of Chiaia and Central. The descent to the level of the tracks is via two sets of fixed stairs and furniture while the output directly via a single ramp. You can also make use of the elevators.

References

See also
Railway stations in Italy
List of Naples metro stations

Naples Metro stations
1993 establishments in Italy
Railway stations opened in 1993
Railway stations in Italy opened in the 20th century
Railway stations in Italy opened in the 21st century